The Ford 2GA was a 
car produced by the Ford in 1942 and came stock with a 90 hp, 6-cylinder engine. The production total came out to 160,211.

Specifications
Technical/mechanical specifications:

Model: Ford 2GA Special
6 Cylinder Inline engine
Wheelbase: 114"
Max Weight: 8093 lb
Valves: Under Header
Bore+Stroke: 3.3 x 4.4
Piston Disp.: 226 Cubic Inches
Max Brake HP @ RPM's: 90 @ 3300 rpm's
Spark Plug Type: z-10
Spark Plug Gap: .30
Pnt. Gap: .15
Fire Order: 153624
Electrical: +/- 6 Volts

See https://web.archive.org/web/20110615153443/http://www.histomobile.com/histomob/internet/41/1129201.jpg for a picture of the Ford 2GA

References

2GA